Nebria kerzhneri is a species of ground beetle in the Nebriinae subfamily that is endemic to Mongolia.

References

kerzhneri
Beetles described in 1982
Beetles of Asia
Endemic fauna of Mongolia